Qarah Daraq-e Sofla (also Romanized as Qarah Daraq-e Soflá) is a village in Abish Ahmad Rural District, Abish Ahmad District, Kaleybar County, East Azerbaijan Province, Iran. At the 2006 census, its population was 141, in 25 families.

References 

Populated places in Kaleybar County